Seri Kembangan, formerly known as Serdang New Village, is a town located in Petaling District, Selangor, Malaysia. The town is now a considerable city in size. It is located near the northern end of the PLUS Expressway Southern Route .

History
Seri Kembangan was established as the Serdang New Village in 1950 when the British moved Malaysian Chinese villagers living around Sungai Besi to a centralised location due to the Communist threat during the Malayan Emergency as part of the Briggs Plan.

In its early days, the village had 50 houses and all were built from scratch because the British only provided empty plots of land. The area was close to rubber estates and the jungle posed dangers of a different kind. Most of the 15,000 inhabitants earned meagre incomes as mining workers and rubber tappers.

At one point, the Seri Kembangan New Village was known for cottage industries like shoe-making and type settings services but this has been overtaken by more profitable ventures.

There are now 2,500 houses with only a smattering of the original wooden houses left and the population is estimated to be 150,000, largely made up of entrepreneurs, businessmen, professionals, government servants who are working in Putrajaya and other multinational corporations employees located in Cyberjaya.

The only form of entertainment around the vicinity in the 1950s until the 1970s was a cinema.

After the 1998 Commonwealth Games, more developments took place from 2000 onwards and other prominent developments includes AEON Equine Park, McDonald's, Pasar Borong Selangor (wholesale market), Maybank, Giant Hypermarket and other businesses transformed this area into a business hub.

Climate and weather
Protected by the Titiwangsa Mountains in the east and Indonesia's Sumatra Island in the west, Seri Kembangan has a tropical rainforest climate (Köppen climate classification Af) which is warm and sunny, along with abundant rainfall, especially during the northeast monsoon season from October to March. Temperatures tend to remain constant.

Politics
The early Community leaders of the village  since 1952 who had greatly contributed towards the development of Serdang New Village were Mr Hee Kon Swee, JP, PPN and Mr Chow Pak Fah, PJK, PPM. Various Government dignitaries were invited by them to assist in improving the conditions and developing the infrastructure of the village. In 1964, the first Prime Minister, Tunku Abdul Rahman visited the village to have the first hand knowledge about the village. This was followed by Assistant Education Minister, Mr Lee Siok Yew.
On 12 November 1968, Deputy Prime Minister Tun Abdul Razak came to open ceremony of the Serdang New Village Secondary School. In 1969, Deputy Prime Minister, Tun Abdul Razak came again for the groundbreaking of Serdang New Village Clinic.
On 10 March 1972, Minister of Health, Mr Lee Siok Yew and Minister of Finance, Tun Tan Siew Sin visited the village. The village also saw the visit of Chief Minister of Selangor, Dato Harun Idris.
These two pioneers Mr Hee and Mr Chow never thought their efforts in improving the lives of the village residents would one day turned this backwater village to become a bustling city today.

At the national level, Seri Kembangan is part of the Puchong parliamentary constituency, currently represented by Gobind Singh Deo of the DAP.
Meanwhile, Seri Kembangan forms its own constituency in the Selangor State Legislative Assembly. The incumbent assemblyperson is Ean Yong Hian Wah, also from the DAP.
Earlier in 1959 till 1964, it was known as Damansara Constituency before it is called Serdang and later Puchong Constituency. The first MP was Karam Singh Veriah from Socialist Front and won the Damansara Constituency twice.

Leisure

Shopping

Seri Kembangan has three major malls: the aforementioned The Mines Shopping Mall, an AEON store in Taman Equine, Giant Hypermarket, and South City Plaza.

Food 
Seri Kembangan is known for its good and varied street food, incorporating Chinese, Malay, Indian and other races' influences into its literal melting pot.
The best places to savour street cuisine include Seri Kembangan Night Market and Seri Serdang Night Market (opens every Monday and Friday nights). The more prominent local dishes include nasi lemak, asam laksa, char kway teow, curry noodle, mamak fried mee, rojak and cendol.

Tourism
Seri Kembangan is home to the Mines Wellness City, a healthcare-oriented resort city. There used to be a theme park known as Mines Wonderland, which operated between 1997 and 2011. The development project also featured a shopping mall and the Palace of the Golden Horses, a luxury hotel.

Transportation

Car
Seri Kembangan is located at the intersection of three tolled highways - PLUS , Besraya and KLS . The Maju Expressway runs near the western fringe of this township. The interchange with KESAS and MRR2 Federal Route 28 lies nearby.

Consequently, Seri Kembangan is regarded as the southern gateway into Kuala Lumpur for motorists travelling from southern Selangor, Negeri Sembilan, Malacca or Johor.

Public transportation
The main rail station serving Seri Kembangan is  KTM Serdang, part of the KTM Komuter network operated by state railway operator KTMB.

Under the MRT Putrajaya line Phase 2 project which is opening in 2023, six stations were located serving areas in Seri Kembangan, Serdang Jaya, Serdang Raya and Universiti Putra Malaysia.

Alternately there is the   Sungai Besi Station which is about 4 km north.

Education
 Universiti Putra Malaysia
 PORTMAN College
 SK Taman Universiti
 SK Seri Serdang
 SK Serdang
 SK Desaminium
 SK Taman Sungai Besi Indah
 Sekolah Menengah Universal Hua Xia
 S.J.K.(C) Bukit Serdang
 S.J.K.(C) Serdang Baru 1
 S.J.K.(C) Serdang Baru 2
 S.J.K.(C) Kung Man
 S.J.K.(T) Serdang
 SMK Seri Serdang
 SMK Seri Indah
 SMK Seri Kembangan
 SMK Desaminium
 Hua Xia International School
 Kingsgate International School
 Alice Smith School, Secondary Campus (International & Private School)
 Australian International School Malaysia - located in MINES Resort City.
Rafflesia International & Private School

References

Petaling District
Towns in Selangor